Rhinotia acrobeles is a species of weevil in the family Belidae. It was first described by Arthur Sidney Olliff in 1889 as Belus acrobeles, from specimens found on Lord Howe Island.

References

Belidae
Beetles described in 1889
Taxa named by Arthur Sidney Olliff